Jack Leo Iker  (born August 31, 1949) is a retired American bishop of the Anglican Church in North America .

Iker is a native of Cincinnati, Ohio. He studied at the University of Cincinnati and the General Theological Seminary. Prior to his election as bishop, he was rector of the Church of the Redeemer, the largest Episcopal parish in Sarasota, Florida. He served on the boards of Forward in Faith North America and the American Anglican Council. Like many Anglo-Catholic clergy, he is a member of the Society of the Holy Cross.

Iker was the third bishop of the Episcopal Diocese of Fort Worth, consecrated as co-adjutor in 1993 and as incumbent in 1995. He was one of the most theologically conservative bishops during his tenure and would be one of the last Episcopal bishops opposed to women's ordination. In 2008, most of the clergy and parishes in the diocese left the Episcopal Church to create the identically named Episcopal Diocese of Fort Worth, affiliated to the Anglican Church in North America. Iker left the Episcopal Church with them, becoming the first bishop of the new diocese. He was one of the founding bishops of the Anglican Church in North America in 2009.

In 2017, Iker declared his diocese was in impaired communion with ACNA dioceses which ordain women:

Iker retired in December 2019.

See also
 Anglican realignment

References

1949 births
Living people
20th-century Anglican bishops in the United States
21st-century Anglican bishops in the United States
Anglo-Catholic bishops
American Anglo-Catholics
Bishops of the Anglican Church in North America
Religious leaders from Cincinnati
University of Cincinnati alumni
General Theological Seminary alumni
Episcopal bishops of Fort Worth
Anglican realignment people